Değirmencik may refer to the following places in Turkey:

 Değirmencik, Bayburt
 Değirmencik, Biga
 Değirmencik, Daday
 Değirmencik, Nusaybin